The Wild Fields (or , also translated as "the wilderness") is a historical term used in the Polish–Lithuanian documents of the 16th to 18th centuries to refer to the Pontic steppe in the territory of present-day Eastern and Southern Ukraine and Western Russia, north of the Black Sea and Azov Sea. According to Ukrainian historian Vitaliy Shcherbak the term appeared sometime in the 15th century for territory between the Dniester and mid-Volga when colonization of the region by Zaporozhian Cossacks started. Shcherbak notes that the term's contemporaries, such as Michalo Lituanus, Blaise de Vigenère, and Józef Wereszczyński, wrote about the great natural riches of the steppes and the Dnieper basin.

For centuries, the region was only sparsely populated by various nomadic groups such as Scythians, Alans, Huns, Bulgars, Pechenegs, Kipchaks, Turco-Mongols, Tatars and Nogais. After the Mongol invasion of Kievan Rus', the territory was ruled by the Golden Horde until the Battle of Blue Waters (1362), which allowed Algirdas to claim it for the Grand Duchy of Lithuania. As a result of the Battle of the Vorskla River in 1399, his successor Vytautas lost the territory to Temür Qutlugh, the khan of the Golden Horde. In 1441, the western section of the Wild Fields, Yedisan, came to be dominated by the Crimean Khanate, a political entity controlled by the expanding Ottoman Empire from the 16th century onward. The Wild Fields were also partly inhabited by the Zaporizhian Cossacks, as reflected in works of the Polish theologian and Catholic bishop of Kiev Józef Wereszczyński, who settled there under the condition that they would fight off expansion by the Nogai Horde.

The Wild Fields were traversed by the Muravsky Trail and Izyumsky Trail, important warpaths used by the Crimean Tatars to invade and pillage the Grand Duchy of Moscow. The Crimean-Nogai Raids, a long period of raids and fighting between the Crimean Tatars and Nogai Horde on one side and the Grand Duchy of Lithuania and the Grand Duchy of Moscow on the other side, caused considerable devastation and depopulation in the area before the rise of the Zaporozhian Cossacks, who periodically sailed down the Dnieper in dugouts from their base at Khortytsia and raided the coast of the Black Sea. The Turks built several fortress towns to defend the littoral, including Kara Kerman and Khadjibey.

By the 17th century, the east part of the Wild Fields had been settled by runaway peasants and serfs who made up the core of the Cossackdom. During the Bohdan Khmelnytsky Uprising the north part of this area was settled by Cossacks from the Dnieper basin and came to be known as Sloboda Ukraine. After a series of Russo-Turkish wars waged by Catherine the Great, the area formerly controlled by the Ottomans and the Crimean Tatars was incorporated into the Russian Empire in the 1780s. The Russian Empire built many of the cities in the Wild Fields, including Odessa, Sevastopol, Yekaterinoslav, and Nikolaev. Most of Kiev was also built during this time. The area was filled with Russian and Ukrainian settlers and the name "Wild Fields" became outdated; it was instead referred as New Russia (Novorossiya). According to the Historical Dictionary of Ukraine, "The population consisted of military colonists from hussar and lancer regiments, Ukrainian and Russian peasants, Cossacks, Serbs, Montenegrins, Hungarians, and other foreigners who received land subsidies for settling in the area."

In the 20th century, after the collapse of the USSR, the region was divided among Ukraine, Moldova, and Russia.

See also
New Serbia (historical province)
Southern Ukraine
Novorossiya
High Plains

References

External links
Cossack era
The Zaphorozian Cossacks

Historical regions
Historical regions in Ukraine
Geographic history of Ukraine
Donbas
Cossack Hetmanate
Zaporozhian Host
History of Kherson Oblast
Marches (country subdivision)
Zaporizhzhia (region)